Idiot: I Do Ishq Only Tumse is a 2012 Odia film directed by Ashok Pati starring Babushaan and Riya Dey. The film's  music director was Goodli Rath.

Cast
 Babushaan as Sanjay
 Riya Dey as Ichha
 Mihir Das as Guru Bhai
 Debashis Parta as Pratik
 Praygan Khatua as Silsila
 Jairam Samal as Chatrubhuj
 Minaketan Das as Gobardhan
 Pritiraj Satpathy as Bishnu
 Soumya Narayan Panda a.k.a. Chancha as Chancha
 Rabi Kumar 
 Priyanka Mahapatra as Lakshmi

Music

References

External links
 

2010s Odia-language films
2012 films
Films directed by Ashok Pati